Marco Polo Ortigas Manila is a hotel at the Ortigas Center in Pasig, Metro Manila, Philippines.

Construction
First SLP Holdings through its unit Xin Tian TI Development Corporation agreed in May 2012 with the Marco Polo Hotels Group to build the Marco Polo Ortigas Manila.

The groundbreaking ceremony was held in December 10, 2010. President Benigno Aquino III opened the Marco Polo Ortigas Manila on July 9, 2014.

Architecture and design
The architectural design of the hotel building was done by Japan-based firm MOHRI, Architect & Associates while The interior design of the hotel was done by Canada-based GLYPH Design Studio.

Features
The hotel has 316 rooms and suites which includes two Continental Club floors. Dining outlets hosted inside the hotel is Cucina, an all-day dining restaurant, Lung Hin, a Cantonese restaurant, Café Pronto, a coffee venue and VU's, a sky bar and lounged at the 45th (sic) floor of the hotel.

The hotel's rooms and amenities are situated on the top 20 of its 41 floors, leading to the claim that it is the first "sky hotel".

Reception
In 2016, the management of Marco Polo Ortigas Hotel was awarded the 2015 Spirit of Marco Polo Best Guest Experience Award, and the hotel was given a 5-star accreditation by the Department of Tourism.

References

Hotels in Metro Manila
Buildings and structures in Pasig
Hotel buildings completed in 2014
Hotels established in 2014
Skyscrapers in Ortigas Center
Skyscraper hotels in the Philippines